Lee Kyu-hyung (Korean: 이규형; born November 29, 1983) is a South Korean actor. Though primarily a musical actor, Lee has also appeared in a variety of Korean films and dramas. In 2017, Lee shot to fame with his portrayal of Yoo Han-yang in tvN's television series Prison Playbook (2017). He is well known for portraying a wide spectrum of roles on stage and screen.

Early life 
Lee Kyu-hyung was born on November 29, 1983, in Seoul, South Korea.

His family consists of his parents and an older sister.

Lee's interest in acting was inspired by the 1999 Korean film Shiri, and he began to pursue roles in theater in hopes of becoming a movie star.

Lee attended Joongdong High School in Seoul, where he was a part of the theatre club.

He was accepted into Kyung Hee University's film and theatre department, but dropped out before completing his degree and later graduated from Dongguk University with a major in Theater Studies. Lee made the decision to transfer to Dongguk as it was the alma mater of Choi Min-sik, an actor he admired.

Career 
Lee Kyu-hyung began his acting career in the Seoul Metropolitan Police Agency's " Whistle Theater " whilst attending college and completing his mandatory military service. After graduating, he continued to act in theater, as well as appearing in musicals.

Lee made his film debut in 2001 with a minor role in the movie Kick the Moon. He has since starred in various plays and musicals, most notably with recurring roles in Laundry, Fan Letter, and Gloomy Day.

In 2013, he appeared in the film The Face Reader after receiving a phone call from a friend that the actor slated to appear had a flat tire and couldn't come to set.

In 2017, he played the role of Yoon Se-won, chief of the prosecution's investigation team, in the tvN drama Stranger, raising his profile. He was then cast as Yoo Han-yang, a second-generation tycoon serving in prison for drug use, in tvN's television series Prison Playbook (2017). Director Shin Won-ho and writer Lee Woo-jung asked him to audition for the role after seeing his performances in the play Come See Me and the musical Fan Letter. Many viewers connected to his portrayal of the role, showcasing both cute and serious sides of the character, and it led to an increase in popularity for the actor both in Korea and overseas. Speaking about the character's homosexuality, Lee expressed an awareness of homophobia in Korean society, but stated that he hoped his portrayal of the character could show a simple, human love that audiences could support.

Lee was nominated for Best Supporting Actor at the 3rd Korean Musical Awards for his role as D'Ysquith in the 2018 production of the musical A Gentleman's Guide to Love and Murder. The role required him to play nine different members of the D'Ysquith family, with rapid costume changes throughout the performance.

In 2019, Lee appeared as the titular character in the CJ Entertainment production of the musical Cyrano, alongside musical actors Ryu Jung-han, Choi Jae-woong, and Jo Hyung-gyun. The production was met with praise, and was lauded as an improvement from the 2017 production, due in part to the various charms of its leading actors. Following his appearance in Cyrano, Lee starred as Hedwig in the rock musical Hedwig and the Angry Inch, receiving critical acclaim for the powerful vocal performance and skillful acting. In November 2019, Lee reprised his role as the writer Kim Hae-jin in the musical Fan Letter, a Korean musical set during Japanese occupation in the 1930s.

In 2020, Lee is slated to appear in the film Stellar, a fantasy comic drama directed by Kwon Soo-kyung. And in 2022, he starred in the South Korean series, All of Us Are Dead.

Filmography

Film

Television series

Web series

Television show

Theater

Awards and nominations

References

External links 
 
 
 

1983 births
Living people
South Korean male television actors
South Korean male film actors
Dongguk University alumni
South Korean male musical theatre actors
South Korean male stage actors